is a science fiction third-person shooter video game released by Taito. It was adapted into an anime television series in 2001.

Plot
The long war between the planet Earth and the machine men is finally over, resulting in a peace that is more a victory for the machine men than the Earth. Warius Zero lost his family in the war to the machinemen but despite this he still is a member of the Earth fleet that is now working in concert with the machine men. His ship, made up of both humans and machine men, has been given a near impossible task: capture the space pirate Captain Harlock. While Zero struggles to accomplish this task, evidence begins to surface that the peace between machine men and Earth may not be as it seems.

Characters
Captain Warius Zero 
After having his wife and child disappear in the battle between the humans and Machine men, Zero has no choice but to serve Earth's government as a Captain of second rate ships. After a run-in with the legendary Captain Harlock, Zero is given the new task of hunting down the space pirate. After meeting Harlock, Zero has more of an appreciation towards him and stills believes in him even after he sees him attack civilians. Later on in the series, Zero and his first officer Marina Oki grow feelings for each other and end up falling in love.

Harlock 
Marina Oki 
Lady Emeraldas 
Tochiro 
Grenadier 
Silviana 
Nohara 
Umihara 
Ishikura 
Rai 
Dr. Machine 
Battlizer 
Yattaran 
Axelater 
Phase Breaker 
Helmatier 
Zess Voder

References to other works

Leiji Matsumoto's other older works were referenced in this series.

First Officer Marina Oki's home has marine snow, a direct reference to Leiji's 1980 television special "Legend of Marine Snow".
The main weapon of the Karyū is the "Saint Elmo", a reference to the 1987 Saint Elmo - Apostle of Light.

Reception 
Helen McCarthy in 500 Essential Anime Movies praised the screenplay and commented that "very few writers handle doomed heroism as well as Matsumoto".

References

External links
Leiji Matsumoto page
Enoki Films Cosmo page

2001 anime television series debuts
Adventure anime and manga
Discotek Media
Leiji Matsumoto
Science fiction anime and manga